Berende Izvor is a village in Dragoman Municipality, Sofia Province,  in Western Bulgaria.

References

Villages in Sofia Province